Fairy Tale is the third solo album by Malaysian Chinese singer Michael Wong, released on 21 January 2005.

Wong's previous two albums, Michael's First Album and Ray of Light earned a fan base but did not make much ground in terms of record sales. Fairy Tale was critically acclaimed and became Wong's best-selling album.

Title song 
The first single from this album, also called Fairy Tale, was composed by himself. Wong, who is more of a composer and hardly wrote lyrics, asked about 30 lyricists for suggestions for this particular song. After finally adding a finishing touch to the song with lyrics he wrote himself, he then left it to be arranged and produced by the experienced Japanese producer, Taichi Nakamura. Fairy Tale is considered by many fans as Wong's strongest single. It became number one at the Baidu 500 immediately after it was released in January 2005, making it to the top of the download counter  for 15 weeks. The single is arguably the most successful Chinese language song in the 21st Century. As of 2007 it is still among the top in the karaoke charts. Wong became the first Malaysian to win four main awards in the Chinese music scene's biggest award show, the Hong Kong TVB8 Golden Music Awards on 3 December 2005. He won Best Composition, Best Composer/Artist, Top Ten Songs of the Year, and Best of the Year's Top 10 Songs.

The music video accompanying Fairy Tale has been the subject of heated debate. It depicts Wong playing the song at a concert, transmitted to a girl in a hospital bed by phone. Intermittent flashbacks during the song reveal that she had a nosebleed before collapsing. She was most likely suffering from some form of cancer. At the conclusion of the video, she dies, and a voice-over says, "When the whole world ignores me, only you can never ignore me okay?"

As of 2021, the song is celebrated as a cult classic among the overseas Chinese community, often described as the one Mandarin song that everyone knows, regardless of how strong or weak their link to Chinese culture is. This is especially prevalent on the widely popular Facebook group Subtle Asian Traits.

Track listing 
 "Intro"
 "童話" (Tóng Huà; Fairy Tale)
 "天堂" (Tiāntáng; Heaven)
 "少年" (Shàonián; Teenager)
 "手機留言" (Shǒu Jī Liú Yan; Cellphone Voice Message)
 "向左走向右走" (Xiàng Zuǒ Zǒu Xiàng Yoù Zǒu; Turn Left Turn Right)
 "一點光一點亮" (Yī Diǎn Guāng Yī Diǎn Liàng; Little Light, Little Bright)
 "期限" (Qī Xiàn; Deadline)
 "海邊" (Hǎi Biān; Beside the Sea)
 "妹妹" (Mèimèi; Little Sister)
 "記得我愛你" (Jì de Wǒ Ài Nǐ; Remember I Love You)
 "The End"

Bonus MV VCD 
 Fairy Tale 童話
 The First Time 第一次
 Sadness Subway 傷心地鐵
 Christmas in 2999 2999年的聖誕節
 As if nothing had happened 若無其事

Cover versions 
 Hong Kong singer Charlene Choi, part of the Cantopop duo Twins, sang a cover version of this song in Cantonese
 Singaporean pop singer Aliff Aziz sang a cover version in Malay titled Cinta Arjuna.
 Cambodian singer Sokun Nisa sang a cover of the song in Khmer called Srok Trik Pneak Pel kom Pong Nhor Nhim.
 Japanese singer Kousuke Atari sang a cover version in Japanese.
 Korean singer Kim Hyung Joong (ko) sang a cover version in Korean called Dong Hwa (동화)
 Indonesian singer Yuni Shara sang the cover version in Indonesian titled Selamanya Aku Milikmu, the song was later used as soundtrack of Indonesian TV series Saur Sepuh

References

2005 albums
Michael Wong (singer) albums